Johnny Gredula Sings is an Australian television series which aired on Sydney station ATN-7 from 1959 to 1960. It was a music series, with the songs sung by singer Hungarian-born Johnny Gredula, who sang requested songs.

Prior to this, he starred in The Johnny Gredula Show on ABC.

References

External links
Johnny Gredula Sings on IMDb

1959 Australian television series debuts
1960 Australian television series endings
Australian music television series
Black-and-white Australian television shows
English-language television shows